Andrena krigiana is a species in the family Andrenidae ("mining bees"), in the order Hymenoptera ("ants, bees, wasps and sawflies"). The species is known generally as the "dwarf-dandelion andrena".
It is found in North America.

References

Further reading
 Ross H. Arnett. (2000). American Insects: A Handbook of the Insects of America North of Mexico. CRC Press.

External links
NCBI Taxonomy Browser, Andrena krigiana

krigiana
Insects described in 1901